is a Japanese novelist and game scenario writer.

Career 
Zen originally released their novel {{Nihongo|The Saga of Tanya the Evil|幼女戦記|Yōjo Senki| The Military Chronicles of a Little Girl'''}} on the user-generated novel publishing website Arcadia. In June 2013, the first volume of said series was published by Enterbrain.

This series would later be adapted to manga, anime and a film. The novel and manga are being translated into English by Yen Press.

 Works 

 Novels 

 The Saga of Tanya the Evil (幼女戦記) (Illustrated by Shinobu Shinotsuki, published by Enterbrain, 12 volumes, 2013–)
 Yakusoku no Kuni (約束の国) (Original character designs by Shinobu Shinotsuki, illustrated by Hidetoshi Iwamoto, published by Seikaisha FICTIONS, 4 volumes, 2014–2017)
 Seventh Dragon 3 UE72 Mikan no Yūma (セブンスドラゴン3 UE72 未完のユウマ) (Original by Sega, illustrated by Shirow Miwa, published by Seikaisha FICTIONS, 2016)
 Jyūma Taisen Okotahakarigoto Renri (銃魔大戦 怠謀連理) (Illustrated by Mura, published by Enterbrain, 2016)
 Yakitori (ヤキトリ) (Illustrated by so-bin, published by Hayakawa Bunko JA, 2 volumes, 2017–)

 Manga 

 The Saga of Tanya the Evil (幼女戦記) (Original character designs by Shinobu Shinotsuki, illustrated by Chika Tōjō, published by Comp Ace, 21 volumes, 2016–)
 Baikoku Kikan (売国機関) (Illustrated by Yoshinao Shina, published by Kurage Bunch, 5 volumes, 2018–)
 Taylor Kyōju no Ayashii Jyugyō (テロール教授の怪しい授業) (Illustrated by Ten Ishida, published by Morning, 3 volumes, 2018–)

 Game scenarios 

 Chaos Dragon Konton Sensō (ケイオスドラゴン 混沌戦争) (Vallagan Kyōwakoku Renbō (ヴァラガン共和国連邦) scenario)
 Jyūma no Reza Nation (銃魔のレザネーション) (Original creator, scenario)

 Magazine publications and anthologies 

 Fiction

 Yakitori 1 Issengorin no Kidō Kōka (ヤキトリ 1 一銭五厘の軌道降下) (Published in S-F Magazine) (August 2017 edition)
 Shinsei Songen (神聖尊厳) (Saredo Zainin wa Ryū to Odoru Orchestra = Dances with the Dragons) (されど罪人は竜と踊るオルケストラ = Dances with the Dragons) (Original creator Rabo Asai, published by Gagaga Bunko, January 2018 edition)
 Carlo Zen no Baai (Jyaga Tom Keisatsu no Koroshikata) and others, (Sakka Tobōmeshi), (Published by Seikaisha FICTIONS, May 2020, reprint from dōjinshi)

 Essays

 a day in my squad731 - case.177'' (Published in Shōsetsu Subaru, November 2017 edition)

References

External links 

 
 フォート・カフェイン - Blog
 存在X - Shōsetsuka ni Narō userpage

Living people
Japanese novelists
Light novelists
Year of birth missing (living people)